Bruno de Paula Ribeiro Ingrácia (born 1 April 1983 in Tupã, São Paulo), known as Bruno Ribeiro, is a Brazilian footballer who plays for Marília as a right back.

Career
Bruno started his footballing career with Marília and played for several other Brazilian teams, such as Palmeiras and Grêmio Barueri.

Blackburn Rovers
On 12 August 2011, Bruno signed for Blackburn Rovers on a three-year deal with an option of a fourth, after being issued with a work-permit. During his time at Rovers he was comically nicknamed the 'Brazilian Denis Irwin' by the Rovers players "because he never gives the ball away" according to manager Steve Kean. Ribeiro failed to make a single appearance for Rovers in the 2011/12 Barclays Premier League season as the club was relegated to the championship.

On 22 August 2012, Bruno made his 1st team debut for Blackburn Rovers, against Hull City coming on as a substitute. On 25 August 2012, Bruno made his first start for Blackburn Rovers, against Leicester City. He also earned the Man of the Match award. On 1 September Bruno made his third appearance for Blackburn in a 3–3 draw away at Leeds United.

On 8 January 2013, Ribeiro signed for Clube Atlético Linense on a six-month loan until the end of the 2012/13 season.

On 2 January 2014 Ribeiro returned to his homeland to sign for the club where he played on loan for the last six months Clube Atlético Linense on a free transfer.

Club career statistics

References

External links

1983 births
Living people
Brazilian footballers
Brazilian expatriate footballers
Expatriate footballers in England
Campeonato Brasileiro Série A players
Campeonato Brasileiro Série B players
English Football League players
Marília Atlético Clube players
Sociedade Esportiva Palmeiras players
Figueirense FC players
Paulista Futebol Clube players
Fortaleza Esporte Clube players
Guaratinguetá Futebol players
Grêmio Barueri Futebol players
Blackburn Rovers F.C. players
Clube Atlético Linense players
Treze Futebol Clube players
Sociedade Esportiva Matonense players
Esporte Clube Juventude players
Joinville Esporte Clube players
Association football defenders
People from Tupã, São Paulo